Northwell Health Ice Center is a multipurpose ice hockey facility in East Meadow, New York, containing two regulation-sized NHL rinks and one outdoor recreational rink. It is owned and operated by the New York Islanders, an NHL team, and is used primarily by the local community for a variety of reasons, including 'learning to skate', house leagues and summer camps.

After founding both a men's and women's ice hockey team, Long Island University reached an agreement with the New York Islanders to use both the Northwell Health Ice Center and Islanders Iceworks as their home rinks.

References

Indoor arenas in New York (state)
College ice hockey venues in the United States
Indoor ice hockey venues in the United States
New York Islanders venues
Sports venues in New York (state)
Sports venues in Nassau County, New York

External links
 Official Website